Dara Lindenbaum is an American election lawyer and lobbyist working at Sandler Reiff Lamb Rosenstein & Birkenstock, P.C. In January 2022, she was nominated to serve as a commissioner of the Federal Election Commission (FEC). She was confirmed by the Senate in May 2022.

Education 
Lindenbaum earned a Bachelor of Arts degree in art history from Northeastern University and a Juris Doctor from the George Washington University Law School in 2011.

Career 
During the Iraq War, Lindenbaum was an activist with Code Pink. After graduating from law school, she worked as associate counsel in the Voting Rights Project at the Lawyers' Committee for Civil Rights Under Law. She was also a development assistant at Americans United for Separation of Church and State. During the 2018 Georgia gubernatorial election, Lindenbaum worked as general counsel for Stacey Abrams's campaign. In 2020, Lindenbaum was legal counsel for Fair Fight Action.

FEC Nomination
On January 21, 2022, President Joe Biden nominated Lindenbaum to be a commissioner of the Federal Election Commission. Hearings were held before the Senate Rules Committee on the nomination on April 6, 2022. The committee favorably reported the nomination on May 3, 2022. She was confirmed by the full Senate on May 24, 2022 by a vote of 54–38, with 6 Republicans supporting her confirmation. She was sworn in on August 2, 2022.

References 

Year of birth missing (living people)
Living people
21st-century American women lawyers
21st-century American lawyers
American lobbyists
George Washington University Law School alumni
Members of the Federal Election Commission
Northeastern University alumni
Virginia Democrats